Paropsonema is a discoidal animal known from the Cambrian Chengjiang biota and classified with the eldoniids.

References

Cambrian invertebrates
Prehistoric animal genera